Janvrin is the surname of

 Hal Janvrin (1892–1962), baseball player for the Boston Red Sox
 John Janvrin (1762–1835), businessman, politician, militia officer, and justice of the peace in Canada
 Kip Janvrin (born 1965), American decathlete
 Richard Janvrin (1915–1993), Royal Navy officer
 Robin Janvrin, Baron Janvrin (born 1946), Private Secretary to the Sovereign

Janvrin may also refer to

 Janvrin Island, Canadian island near Cape Breton Island
 Janvrin Island Peninsula, Nova Scotia, community in the Canadian province of Nova Scotia